Redoubt Kali was a Russian fort on the east coast of the Black Sea. It was 10 miles north of Poti. It was captured by the British during the Crimean War in 1854. The redoubt was colloquially commonly called the Redut Kale, modern Kulevi in Georgia. The redoubt was demolished in the early 20th-century in 1907.

See also
 Black Sea Coast

References

External links 
 

Crimean War
Redoubts
Castles and forts in Georgia (country)
Buildings and structures in Samegrelo-Zemo Svaneti